Winfield is a town in Winfield Township, Lake County, Indiana. The population was 2,298 at the time of the 2000 census, 4,383 in 2010, and 5,987 in 2019. The town was incorporated in 1993 in order to keep the residents from being annexed by other neighboring communities. Prior to that time it had been part of Winfield Township as an unincorporated town. Winfield is named for General Winfield Scott. The town is served by the Crown Point post office and addresses in Winfield share the Crown Point ZIP code.

In 2014 Winfield formed a Marshal department for public safety and law enforcement duties, prior to that time police protection services were provided by the Lake County Sheriff's Department.

Geography
Winfield is located at  (41.412821, -87.260727).

Demographics

2010 census
As of the census of 2010, there were 4,383 people, 1,427 households, and 1,144 families living in the town. The racial makeup of the town was 88.5% White, 3.7% African American, 0.4% Native American, 3.5% Asian, 2.5% from other races, and 1.3% from two or more races. Hispanic or Latino of any race were 8.9% of the population.

There were 1,427 households, of which 44.4% had children under the age of 18 living with them, 70.7% were married couples living together, 6.2% had a female householder with no husband present, 3.3% had a male householder with no wife present, and 19.8% were non-families. 16.4% of all households were made up of individuals, and 7.1% had someone living alone who was 65 years of age or older. The average household size was 3.00 and the average family size was 3.39.

The median age in the town was 38.7 years. 29% of residents were under the age of 18; 5.8% were between the ages of 18 and 24; 25.9% were from 25 to 44; 26.1% were from 45 to 64; and 13% were 65 years of age or older. The gender makeup of the town was 48.7% male and 51.3% female.
 		 	 	
The median income for a household in the town was $65,641, and the median income for a family was $70,489. Males had a median income of $52,143 versus $28,516 for females. The per capita income for the town was $24,765. About 0.9% of families and 2.8% of the population were below the poverty line, including 2.4% of those under age 18 and 8.5% of those age 65 or over.

2000 census
As of the census of 2000, there were 2,298 people, 692 households, and 581 families living in the town. The racial makeup of the town was 95.13% White, 0.35% African American, 0.26% Native American, 0.65% Asian, 1.44% from other races, and 2.18% from two or more races. Hispanic or Latino of any race were 4.26% of the population.

There were 692 households, out of which 46.8% had children under the age of 18 living with them, 77.5% were married couples living together, 4.0% had a female householder with no husband present, and 16.0% were non-families. 12.4% of all households were made up of individuals, and 6.6% had someone living alone who was 65 years of age or older. The average household size was 3.08 and the average family size was 3.40.

In the town, the population was spread out, with 28.7% under the age of 18, 5.8% from 18 to 24, 33.7% from 25 to 44, 17.8% from 45 to 64, and 13.9% who were 65 years of age or older. The median age was 35 years. For every 100 females, there were 93.3 males. For every 100 females age 18 and over, there were 87.8 males.

Education
Winfield schools are actually a part of the Crown Point Community School Corporation. Elementary grades are split between Winfield Elementary School (for K-2) and Jerry Ross Elementary School (3-5), both located in Winfield. Middle school students go over to Crown Point and attend either Colonel John Wheeler Middle School or Robert A. Taft Middle School. Students attend nearby Crown Point High School. Winfield has a public library, a branch of the Crown Point Community Public Library.

References

Towns in Lake County, Indiana
Towns in Indiana
Populated places established in 1993
1993 establishments in Indiana